The Himalayans may refer to:

 The Himalayans (band), 70s Nepali rock band
 The Himalayans (American band), 90s American band
 Himalayas (band), Welsh band

See also
 Himalaya (disambiguation)
 Himalayan (disambiguation)